Ojinika Anne Okpe (born 23 April 1981), also known as Ojy Okpe, is a Nigerian model, film producer and TV anchor on Arise News, who hosts What's Trending with Ojy Okpe and co-anchors the Good Morning Show.

Background and education 
Okpe is from Ukwani, in Delta State. She was born to Philomena Ngozi Egwuenu and Matthew Egwuenu, a former Nigerian commissioner of police. She had her primary education at Queensland Academy and her secondary school certificate education in Rainbow College, both in Lagos State. In 2006, she earned a Bachelor's degree in Communication and a minor in Film Production from St John’s University, New York. She also studied Film Production at the New York Film Academy.

Career 
In an interview with Business Day, Okpe iterates how her career path has always been about the camera, transitioning from modeling to film to journalism.

She was discovered by a South African talent scout called Jan Malan. She gained her breakthrough recognition by participating in the Mnet Face of Africa like Oluchi Onweagba. She made it to the finals of the competition which was held in Ghana. After that, she worked in South Africa and subsequently in New York as a model, under Storm Management. She has been on the pages of fashion and lifestyle magazines Elle, Cosmopolitan, Essence, Drum and Vogue.  She has also worked with fashion designers and houses including Oscar de la Renta, Zang Toi, Moschino, Ralph Lauren, Gottex, Dumebi Iyamah, Jean Paul Gaultier, Deola Sagoe, Versace Mai Atafo, Baby Phat, Lanre da Silva and Dolce & Gabbana. She covered the premium issue of the Mania magazine in 2012.  She has graced the runways of various African fashion weeks including the South Africa fashion week, the Lagos Fashion Week, Port Harcourt International Fashion Week and Arise TV fashion week. She attended the Martini themed afterparty of the Lagos Fashion Week in 2019, and the 2018 AMVCA, where she was tagged as the best dressed by The Netng. Outside of Africa, she has worked as a runway model in Paris, New York and London. She also worked with L'Oreal's Mizani as the face of the brand in Africa. 

As a TV anchor, she hosts the Arise News Good Morning Show, alongside Reuben Abati and Tundun Abiola on the weekdays, and with Steve Ayorinde on Sundays. She also hosts her segment called What's Trending with Ojy Okpe. She has also interviewed public figures including Chimamanda Ngozi Adichie, Oluchi Onweagba, Omotola Jalade Ekeinde, Susan Sarandon, Sarah Jessica Parker, Iman and Idina Menzel.  In 2020, she was nominated for the TV personality of the year award at the Exquisite Ladies Of the Year (ELOY) awards, for her work on Arise News. 

She is an Emmy Awards winner as part of the production crew of the documentary Changers: How the Harlem Globetrotters Battled Racism. She was also part of Hollywood productions The Devil Wears Prada and Marvel movie Spider-Man 3.

Personal life 
She was married to one Austin Okpe; they are divorced. They have two children together; a boy and a girl. She is best mates with Genevieve Nnaji and Oluchi Onweagba-Orlandi, with the trio going on several vacations together.

References

External links 
 

1981 births
Living people
People from Delta State
Igbo people
Nigerian female models
Nigerian television personalities
Nigerian beauty pageant contestants
21st-century beauty pageant contestants